Frenchpark, historically known as Dungar, is a village in County Roscommon, Ireland on the N5 national primary road. It was the home of Douglas Hyde, the first President of Ireland. 
The nearby French Park Estate was until 1952 the ancestral seat of the French family, Barons de Freyne. The estate was sold to the Irish Land Commission in the 1950s and was dismantled by the mid 1970s. A historic smokehouse is one of the few remaining legacies of this period.

History

Early history 
The Ciarrage groups in Dún Gar (now Frenchpark) were the early lords of Airteach. Mac Donagh is cited as later lords of Airtech. The O'Flanagan here were hereditary stewards to the Kings of Connacht.

17th to 19th centuries

The Dominican Priory of the Holy Cross, Cloonshanville was sacked during the Cromwellian campaign of the 1650s. Part of the tower still stands (in a ruined state). The site is still used as the local cemetery.

The French family, originally from Galway, became the dominant landowners in this part of Roscommon in the late seventeenth century. Dominick French was granted 5000 acres of land in County Roscommon and his son John a further 2000 acres. John's wealth and influence were such that he was nicknamed An Tiarna Mor (the Great Lord).

Barons de Freyne, former owners of Frenchpark

In the 1749 Census of Elphin it was the residence of Arthur French, MP in the Parliament of Ireland who  was the eldest son of  John (An Tiarna Mor) and  his wife Anne Gore. His son Arthur French (1764-1820) was also an MP who was said to have died "from excessive fox hunting". His son, also named Arthur French (1786–1856), became the first Baron de Freyne.

Members of the French family were buried in the graveyard surrounding the ruins of Frenchpark Priory. At the time of Griffith's Valuation Frenchpark was owned by Rev. John Ffrench, Lord de Freyne and was valued at £60. Later in the 1800s the family converted to Roman Catholicism.

French Park
The ancestral seat of the Barons de Freyne was French Park, also known as French Park House, on the outskirts of Frenchpark village in County Roscommon. The manor house, originally built in the mid-17th century before being rebuilt in the Georgian style in the 18th century, was demolished after the sale of the estate by the 7th Baron de Freyne to the Irish Land Commission in 1952. The Land Commission removed the roof of the buildings in 1953 and eventually demolished the remaining structures in ca 1975. The present Lord de Freyne lives with his wife and family at Putney in the London Borough of Wandsworth.

A distant cousin of the de Freynes was Charlotte Despard (née French) (1844–1939), a scion of the French family of High Lake, a British-born, later Irish-based suffragist, novelist and Sinn Féin activist. Despard spent a lot of time at French Park where her father was born. In 1908 she joined with Hanna Sheehy-Skeffington and Margaret Cousins to form the Irish Women’s Franchise League. She urged members to boycott the 1911 Census and withhold taxes and provided financial support to workers during the Dublin labour disputes.

In 1909 Despard met Mahatma Gandhi and was influenced for a time by his theory of passive resistance. She moved to Dublin after the First World War and was bitterly critical of her brother, Field Marshal The 1st Viscount French, the Lord Lieutenant of Ireland in 1919-21, who, unsurprisingly, tended to ignore her. Lord French had previously served as the United Kingdom's Commander-in-Chief, Home Forces, during the First World War.

During the Irish War of Independence, together with Maud Gonne, she formed the Women's Prisoners' Defence League to support Republican prisoners. As a member of Cumann na mBan she opposed the Anglo-Irish Treaty, and was imprisoned by the new Government of the Irish Free State during the Irish Civil War. She is buried in the Republican Plot at Glasnevin Cemetery, Dublin.

Market House
The market house is in the centre of Frenchpark, on the main street and was constructed circa 1840. The market house was a place where people went to sell their cattle and farm produce (vegetables, potatoes and oats). On market day, which was always on a Thursday, they would trade, buy and sell. There was a large weighing scales outside the building. Unsold goods were stored in the building. The first electricity was generated for Frenchpark from this building. A film was made in the market house about 'The Hanging of Robert Emmett'. The building is now empty and is surrounded by high railings.

See also
 Frenchpark (barony)

References

External links

Frenchpark Estate Record 
French Family
www.cracroftspeerage.co.uk

Towns and villages in County Roscommon
Planned communities in the Republic of Ireland